Somewhere in Politics is a 1949 British comedy film directed by John E. Blakeley and starring Frank Randle, Tessie O'Shea and Josef Locke. It was the fifth film in the Somewhere series of films featuring Randle followed by It's a Grand Life (1953).

According to the British Film Institute (BFI), only a print of an "18-minute short from the film, entitled Full House", is known to exist.

Plot
Joe Smart (Frank Randle) is a radio repairman who enters the political arena competing in an upcoming election against his own boss. Joe wins the election, but encounters loads of trouble in the process.

Cast
 Frank Randle - Joe Smart
 Tessie O'Shea - Daisy Smart
 Josef Locke - Cllr. Willoughby
 Sally Barnes - Marjorie Willoughby
 Syd Harrison - Tony Parker
 Max Harrison - Arthur Parker
 Bunty Meadows - Martha Parker
 Jimmy Clitheroe - Sonny
 Sonny Burke - Reggie Smart
 Anthony Oakley - Howard
 Bernard Graham - Bank Manager
 Effi McIntosh - Mrs. Jones
 Kay Compston - Lady Hazelmere
 Fred Simister - Detective Sergeant
 George Little - Mayor

Critical reception
In contemporary reviews, The Monthly Film Bulletin wrote: "The provinces will probably enjoy this knockabout comedy, though many Londoners will fail to see the point". To-Day's Cinema concluded: "In addition to the untiring inventiveness of the star in grimace and tumble, the escapades are served by the clowning of Tessie as Randle's electioneering wife - she also heaves her 'two-ton' around in abandoned dance - by the singing of sentimental ditty by Josef Locke, and by the lunacies of Syd and Max in song and sally. It is all put over with pace and vigour, and will doubtless register heartily with the legion of Randle fans."

References

Bibliography
 Richards, Jeffrey. Films and British national identity: from Dickens to Dad's Army. Manchester University Press, 1997.

External links

BFI Most Wanted entry, with extensive notes

1949 films
1948 comedy films
1948 films
Films directed by John E. Blakeley
British comedy films
Lost British films
British black-and-white films
1949 comedy films
Films shot in Greater Manchester
1940s English-language films
1940s British films